Miguel Elizondo Navarrete (born 10 July 1968) is a Mexican sprinter. He competed in the men's 4 × 100 metres relay at the 1988 Summer Olympics. He also competed in the two-man bobsleigh at the 1992 Winter Olympics.

See also
 List of athletes who competed in both the Summer and Winter Olympic games

References

1968 births
Living people
Athletes (track and field) at the 1988 Summer Olympics
Bobsledders at the 1992 Winter Olympics
Mexican male sprinters
Mexican male bobsledders
Olympic athletes of Mexico
Olympic bobsledders of Mexico
Place of birth missing (living people)
20th-century Mexican people